Jason Parker (born May 13, 1975 in Yorkton, Saskatchewan) is a Canadian speed skater who won a silver medal in the Team Pursuit at the 2006 Winter Olympics.

External links 
 Fotos von Jason Parker
 Speaking Website for Jason Parker
 Website for Jason Parker

1975 births
Living people
Canadian male speed skaters
Speed skaters at the 2006 Winter Olympics
Sportspeople from Yorkton
Sportspeople from Saskatchewan
Olympic silver medalists for Canada
Olympic medalists in speed skating
Medalists at the 2006 Winter Olympics
21st-century Canadian people